(February 26, 1928 – December 1, 1998) was a Japanese film actor.

Selected filmography 

 Kenpei (1953)
 Senkan Yamato (1953)
 Anatahan (1953) - Nishio
 Yasen Kangofu (1953) - Nemoto
 Waga koi no lila no kokage ni (1953)
 Nezumi-kozo iro zange tsuki yozakura (1954)
 Jihi shinchô (1954)
 Sensuikan Rogô imada fujôsezu (1954)
 Kimi yue ni (1954)
 Jazz on Parade: Jazz musume kampai! (1955) - Shô-chan
 Akuma no sasayaki (1955) - Tetsuo Hirata
 Osho ichidai (1955) - Matsushima
 Jirô monogatari (1955)
 Aogashima no kodomotachi - Onna kyôshi no kiroku (1955) - Mr. Mori
 Tekketsu no tamashii (1956)
 Onryo sakura dai-sodo (1956) - Hotta Kôzukenosuke Masanobu
 Shin ono ga tsumi (1956)
 Hatoba no Ôja (1956) - Shunsuke Kitamura - Saburô's Friend
 Yôun Satomi kaikyoden (1956) - Inuyama Dôsetsu
 Bôryoku no ôja (1956)
 Bôryokû no geisha (1956)
 Ringu no ôja: Eikô no sekai (1957)
 Dotô no Kyôdai (1957) - Takashi Satomi
 Super Giant (1957) - Okamoto / Detective
 Kenpei to Barabara Shibijin (1957) - Tokusuke Kosaka
 Zoku sûpâ jaiantsu (1957) - Okamoto / Detective
 Sen'un Ajia no Joō (1957)
 Dōtei shain to yoromeki fujin (1958) - Daisaku Todoroki
 Joôbachi (1958) - Syunsuke Yuri
 Taiyô musume to shachô-zoku (1958) - Hiroshi Taguchi
 Zekkai no rajo (1958)
 Kenpei to Yurei (1958)
 Nude model satsujin jiken (1958)
 Ningyô Sashichi torimonochô: Koshimoto Irezumi Shibijin (1958) - Sanjûrô Miyabe
 Joôbachi no ikari (1958) - Hiroshi
 Star Dokusatsu Jiken (1958) - Himself (uncredited)
 Satsujinhan Nanatsu no Kao (1959) - Yûji Maki
 Zoku Satsujinhan Nanatsu no Kao: Kaiketsuhen (1959) - Yûji Maki
 Nitôhei monogatari: Banji yôryô no maki (1959)
 Moro no Ichimatsu yûrei dochu (1959)
 Nanatsu no kao no otoko daze (1960)
 Arashi no naka no wakamono tachi (1960)
 Arega minato no hi da (1961)
 Kawa jean blues (1961)
 Furusato wa midori nariki (1961) - Haruo
 Keishichô monogatari: jûni-nin no keiji (1961) - Detective Takayama
 Morgan keibu to nazô no otoko (1961)
 Ni-nirokushiken Daisshutsu (1962)
 Ano sura no hate ni hoshi hama tataku (1962)
 Hachi gatsu jûgo-nichi no dôran (1962)
 Rikugun zangyaku monogatari (1963)
 Waga kyôkatsu no jinsei (1963)
 Meiji taitei goichidaiki (1964)
 Ressha dai shugêki (1964)
 Doro inu (1964)
 Ankokugai gekitotsu sakusen (1965) - Matsuzaki
 Mushuku mono jingi (1965)
 Shôwa zankyô-den (1965)
 Ultraman (1967, TV Series) - Dr. Ninomiya
 Ultra Seven (1967-1968, TV Series) - Captain Kiriyama
 Otoko no shôbu: Niô no irezumi (1967) - Unryû Azumaya
 Hibotan bakuto: Nidaime shûmei (1969)
 Yoru no suke gari (1972)
 Zone Fighter (1973, TV Series) - Yôichirô Sakimori
 The War in Space (1977)
 Ashita no Jô (1980) - Wakayama
 Rengo kantai (1981)
 Zerosen moyu (1984)
 Hua zai duo qing (1985)
 Sanada Taiheiki (1985, TV Series) - Mōri Terumoto
 Youkai tengoku: Ghost Hero (1990) - (final film role)

References

External links 
 https://www.imdb.com/name/nm0620433/
 http://www14.big.or.jp/~hosoya/who/na/nakayama-shoji.htm  
 http://www.jmdb.ne.jp/person/p0271360.htm 

Japanese male film actors
1928 births
1998 deaths
20th-century Japanese male actors